Uncle Al may refer to

Albert Moss, a Miami disk jockey known as DJ Uncle Al
Albert Lewis, host of the children's television program The Uncle Al Show broadcast from Cincinnati.
Aleister Crowley
Al Jourgensen, frontman of Ministry (band), an American industrial metal band, and co-owner of 13th Planet Records.